Eric Seastrand (February 7, 1938 – June 20, 1990) was an American businessman and politician.

Born in Fresno, California, Seastrand served in the United States Army and the United States Air Force. Seastrand graduated from San Jose State University and was a stockbroker. Seastrand served in the California State Assembly as a Republican, from 1982 until his death from cancer in 1990. His wife, Andrea, was elected in a special election to succeed him and later served in the United States House of Representatives. Seastrand died in Salinas, California.

Notes

1938 births
1990 deaths
People from Fresno, California
People from Salinas, California
Military personnel from California
San Jose State University alumni
Businesspeople from California
Republican Party members of the California State Assembly
20th-century American businesspeople
20th-century American politicians
Deaths from cancer in California